G. lutea may refer to:

 Gagea lutea, a Eurasian plant
 Gastrodia lutea, an achlorophyllous orchid
 Gena lutea, a top snail
 Gentiana lutea, a gentian native to Europe
 Geocrinia lutea, a frog endemic to Southwest Australia
 Gliricidia lutea, a flowering plant
 Gloiocephala lutea, a gilled mushroom
 Gloriosa lutea, an ornamental plant